Pteropygme is a genus of moths of the  family Heliodinidae. It contains only one species, Pteropygme pyrrha, which is found on the Bismarck Archipelago.

References

Heliodinidae